The kong ring or gung treng (Khmer: គង់រេង) is a Cambodian tube zither, in which a tube of bamboo is used as a resonator for stings that run along the outside of the tube, lengthwise. It has the same musical purpose as the "bossed gongs" (circular gongs that have a rounded bump in the center, like a shield boss) and may substitute for them and accompany singing. Although it is a traditional instrument with a long history, it has been improved on in modern times.  The kong ring is represented by similar instruments in other countries of South Asia and the Pacific.

Styles
There are two different syles; the traditional uses bamboo to make the sounding strings, and a more modern style uses new materials.

Traditional
Originally, the strings played were created by cutting the outer layer or crust of the bamboo, to separate 7 strings (leaving them attached to the tube at each end), and placing a bridge pressed underneath at each end. Resonance holes were cut under the strings, long and narrow.

New materials
Instead of creating strings from bamboo, metal strings can also be used, attached with pegs. A resonator gourd may also be added; this may be less a resonator than a way to stabilize the instrument as it is held against the chest.

Asian and Pacific variants
Variants of the Kong ring can be found Vietnam, Thailand, Malaysia, Madagascar and the Philippines.

In Vietnam, a variant exists today, the Đàn goong, that looks like the modern Cambodian instrument, with as many as 17 metal strings and pegs.  With instruments made with steel strings the Vietnamese instruments have one end secured inside the bamboo tube, the other wrapped around a peg on the opposite end, to add string tension and to lift the stings off the bamboo tube.

In Thailand, it can be found among the Karenni Kayan people, where it may have as many as 8 bamboo strings cut from the resonator. Among the Kareni, it is used for love songs, providing a "delicate rhythmic accompanyment."

Variants in Malaysia, Madagascar and the Philippines resemble the older style of kong ring, with strings cut from the bamboo tube and bridges placed under the strips of bamboo turned into strings. Placement of the bridges, and the ability to move them, allows for the Valiha to be tuned to different scales.

In Madagascar the instrument is called valiha. In East Timor it is the "lakado." In Malaysia it is called karaniing and krem. It is used widely in the Philippines and goes by multiple names including  kolitong and kulibit.

Similar tube zithers are believed by some to be the origin of the Chinese Guzheng

References

External links

Video showing kong ring being played.
Sound clip of Vietnamese dinh goong playing.
Kayaw tube zither being played with singing, lament over lost love.
Page has photo of bowed version of a tube zither.

Cambodian musical instruments
Zithers
Tube zithers